The Muzeon Park of Arts (formerly the Park of the Fallen Heroes or Fallen Monument Park) is a park outside the Krymsky Val building in Moscow shared by the modern-art division of the Tretyakov Gallery and the . It is located between the Park Kultury and the Oktyabrskaya underground stations. The largest open-air sculpture museum in Russia, it has more than 700 artworks currently on display and another 200 in storage.

The origins of the English-language exonym "Fallen Monument park" are unknown; Russian-language speakers either simply call the park the Sculpture Park of the Central House of Artists or reference its legal title, Muzeon Park of Arts (Russian: ,  - literally: "Park of the Arts").

History

In 1923, the decision was made to build the All-Russia Agricultural and Industrial Craft Exhibition. The section for foreign pavilions— from Germany, Italy, and elsewhere—was located on the current MUZEON site. In the middle, young architect Andrei Burov built a soccer stadium, unheard of back then. Vladimir Lenin visited the exhibition during his last trip to Moscow, three months before his death. Lenin was driven in a car past pavilions designed by Konstantin Melnikov, Vladimir Shchuko, and Vera Mukhina, before departing for the estate of Gorki, where he died.

The Krymsky Bridge, the first cable-stayed bridge in the Soviet Union and one that continues to serve as a striking example of severe and precise architecture, was built under Joseph Stalin in 1938. Around the same time, the granite Krymskaya and Pushkinskaya embankments were laid down. Until the late 19th century, there hadn't been any embankments at all, just river banks reinforced with paving stones.

During the Great Patriotic War, military hardware and anti-aircraft weapons were stationed near Krymsky Bridge, and by the late 1940s, a vast, empty space had appeared that became the city's largest snow-dumping ground. Architects proposed building everything from the Academy of Sciences to the Palace of the Soviets on the site, but Culture Minister Yekaterina Furtseva insisted on the Central House of Artists (CHA), which broke ground in 1965 amidst wooden shanties. The square around CHA was built in the 1980s.

In the late 1980s, at the height of Perestroika, CHA began holding lavish exhibitions by artists such as Francis Bacon, Giorgio Morandi, Jannis Kounellis, Robert Rauschenberg, and James Rosenquist. Sculptures by Western modernists appeared in the adjacent park.

After Dissolution of USSR 
In October 1991, when the Soviet Union collapsed, smaller socialist realism statues of Soviet leaders and unidentifiable workers and peasants were removed from their pedestals, hauled to the park and left in their fallen form. They were rectified later, although missing original pedestals. In 1990s these statues shaped the park outline, but as more and more modern sculpture was added and as the young trees grew up, they became a less obvious minority.

On August 22, 1991, the statue of Felix Dzerzhinsky was dismantled and brought to the park. The Communist Party was banned the next day.  Busts of Lenin, and statues of Kalinin, Sverdlov, and Stalin from across Moscow started to pile up on the grass. Sculptures were brought in from shuttered sculpture factories, Soviet-era workshops where anonymous artisans manufactured figurines.  There is a list of statues of Vladimir Lenin, many of which were toppled or de-accesioned in the wave of De-Leninization that occurred during this time.

In January 1992, Moscow Mayor Yury Luzhkov signed a decree establishing the MUZEON Park of Arts.  Gradually the statues were hoisted to their feet and arranged throughout the park.  It currently displays over 700 sculptures. It is split into themed sections, i.e. the Oriental Garden, Pushkin Square, Portrait Row, although the best known part—the fallen monuments themselves—many appeared here before 1992.  In the 2000s, the park began hosting symposiums for sculptors working with limestone; the sculptures they donated are displayed on a special square reserved for white-stone sculptures. The symposiums featured a wide range of subjects and participants, including professionals such as Fakhraddin Rzayev, Vladimir Buinachev, and Grigory Krasnoshlykov, as well as amateurs.

MUZEON today

Major changes have taken place at MUZEON since 2011. As part of a government program to boost Moscow's tourism and leisure infrastructure, architect Yevgeny Asse developed a new master plan, including a redesigned landscape, for MUZEON that has transformed the park into a dynamic and contemporary space. Makeshift and rickety structures were removed, and a diagonal, winding “promenade” path linking Krymsky Val and Bolotny Island was laid down. Footpaths were resurfaced with granite pavers. The “School” pavilion (designed by architects Igor Chirkin and Alexey Podkidyshev), where MUZEON's education programs are held, was opened. 

In 2013, following the adoption of a plan by architecture firm “Wowhaus” (Dmitry Likin and Oleg Shapiro) the Krymskaya Embankment was completely rebuilt and turned into a pedestrian area that stretches from the former “Red October” chocolate factory to the Sparrow Hills. Unique perennial flower beds were planted; unobtrusive obstacles for skateboarders and bike lanes were installed along with sleek benches and teardrop-shaped pavilions. A new “Vernisazh” (art exhibition space) with undulating rooftops and spacious, brightly lit stands was built. A splash fountain, Moscow's second, has become a popular attraction.

MUZEON has become not only a place for preserving historical artifacts, but also an open-air contemporary art museum, a special exhibition space, a music festival venue, and a massive creative workshop.

Since July 13, 2019, a "" sculpture by the German artist Mia Florentine Weiss is in the sculpture park.

Famous sculptors

Vera Mukhina 

Vera Mukhina was a 20th-century artist and the most famous female sculptor from the Soviet Union. Many know her as the artist behind “Worker and Kolkhoz Woman,” one of the century's most enduring symbols, but her creative path was much more complex than that. Mukhina herself was a complicated person: a semi-official sculptor and believer in the “new religion” (i.e. of the revolution), as well as a subtle artist who parted with illusions early on; a frosty maiden with expressionless eyes as well as a fragile woman who lived a dramatic life.

Mukhina's connections theater found expression in the fine arts. Thus, We demand peace! (1950), inspired by the conflict between North and South Korea, looks like a mise-en-scène: a masculine Russian soldier, dark-skinned youth with clenched fists, blind man, and a Korean mother holding a baby walk across the banners of a defeated army into a bright future behind a woman releasing a dove. Every contemporary cliché is here; Mukhina's intention was to make a propagandistic sculpture.

Art historian Mikhail Alpatov has called the work cold and contrived, arguing that the artist “couldn’t communicate the idea of fighting for peace in the language of art, which would have allowed her express herself through her work.” Today, however, the sculpture is valuable for a different reason; it's an example of exuberant, semi-official art and an important monument to the era that produced it. Also of interest is the technique Mukhina used, electroplating, which reduced the statue's weight, making it easier to transport between cities and countries.

Yevgeny Vuchetich 

Yevgeny Vuchetich was one of the first well-known sculptors in the Soviet Union to have received an exclusively Soviet education. Vuchetich was extremely prolific, sculpting dozens of official portraits of Soviet heroes. His sculptures are surely too numerous to be the work of one man, but it's unclear how many assistants he employed. All we know is that in the early 1960s, he invited sculptor Vadim Sidur to join him as an apprentice.

Vuchetich's rise was swift. By the end of the Second World War, he had already received a commission to create a sculpture group honoring the late General Yefremov (completed in 1946) and been put in charge of designing the Soviet War Memorial in Berlin's Treptower Park. The story of the Yefremov monument is shrouded in mystery. Why on earth did Stalin suddenly decide to erect a monument to the fallen general, who died after his unit was surrounded by enemy troops? Weren't there many such generals? Why Yefremov? According to one theory, the choice was part of a post-war campaign against Marshal Zhukov, whom Stalin hoped to strip of his official posts. General Yefremov had been sent on a suicide mission by none other than Zhukov, and the statue seemed to be Stalin's way of publicly saying that Zhukov was evil for sending a brave general to his death.

See also
Coronation Park, Delhi, where many British Indian monuments are stored.
Grūtas Park, in Lithuania, known colloquially as "Stalin World"
Memento Park, in Budapest, Hungary
De-Stalinization

Notes and references

External links

Muzeon Park official website
Central House of Artists official website
Guardian Travel photograph of the park
State Tretyakov Gallery or “Apelsin” by the Foster’s studio?
Muzeon Park of Arts
History of social realism art

Culture in Moscow
Parks and gardens in Moscow
Sculpture gardens, trails and parks in Russia
Monument cemeteries